Bhutan sent a delegation to compete at the 1996 Summer Olympics in Atlanta, United States from 19 July to 4 August 1996.  This was the Kingdom's fourth appearance at a Summer Olympic Games.  The delegation to Atlanta consisted of two archers, Jubzhang Jubzhang and Ugyen Ugyen.  Neither advanced past the round of 64 in their events, though Jubzhang pushed his match to a shootout.

Background
The Bhutan Olympic Committee was recognized by the International Olympic Committee on 31 December 1982.  The Kingdom first participated in the Summer Olympic Games at the 1984 Summer Olympics, and have taken part in every Summer Olympics since then, making Atlanta their fourth appearance in a Summer Olympiad.  They have never participated in a Winter Olympic Games.  The 1996 Summer Olympics were held from 19 July to 4 August 1996; 10,318 athletes represented 194 National Olympic Committees.  The Bhutanese delegation to Atlanta consisted of two archers, Jubzhang Jubzhang and Ugyen Ugyen.  Jubzhang was chosen as the flag bearer for the opening ceremony.

Archery

Archery is the national sport of the Kingdom.  Jubzhang Jubzhang was 25 years old at the time of the Atlanta Olympics, and had previously represented Bhutan at the 1992 Summer Olympics.  In the ranking round of the men's individual event, held on 28 July, he scored 643 points, earning the 49th seed out of 64 competitors.  In the first round proper, he tied 156–156, and lost in a shootout 9–8 to Stanislav Zabrodsky of Ukraine.  The gold medal was ultimately won by Justin Huish of the United States, the silver was taken by Magnus Petersson of Sweden, and the bronze was won by Oh Kyo-moon of South Korea.

Ugyen Ugyen was 22 years old at the time of these Olympics and was making her Olympic debut.  In the women's individual, also held on 28 July, she earned 580 points in the ranking round, earning herself the 60th seed.  In the first round, she lost by a score of 153–126 to Olena Sadovnycha of Ukraine.  In the event overall, the gold medal was won by Kim Kyung-wook of South Korea, the silver medal was earned by He Ying of China, and the bronze medal was taken by Olena Sadovnycha of Ukraine.

See also
 Archery in Bhutan

References

Nations at the 1996 Summer Olympics
1996
Olympics